Pendulum is the sixth studio album by American rock band Creedence Clearwater Revival, released by Fantasy Records on December 9, 1970. It was the second studio album the band released that year, arriving five months after Cosmo's Factory.

Overview
The album is the only one by Creedence Clearwater Revival to not contain any cover songs (all of the tracks were written by John Fogerty); it is the last album the band recorded while Tom Fogerty was still a member, as he left the group in early 1971 to start a solo career; and the last of the band's albums to be produced solely by John Fogerty. The only single taken from the album, "Have You Ever Seen the Rain"/"Hey Tonight", was released in January 1971, and reached number eight on the Billboard Hot 100 chart.

The most sonically adventurous CCR album, Pendulum is noted for its widespread use of keyboards and saxophones, in contrast to the group's previous albums, which were dominated by the guitar. It also contains, in the closing instrumental "Rude Awakening #2", an uncharacteristic venture by the band into avant-garde psychedelia.

Production
The album was recorded at Wally Heider Studios in San Francisco, and took a month to complete, which was an unusually long time for the band. On previous albums, they had rehearsed songs before entering the studio, but, for Pendulum, the members learned the songs in the studio. The backing tracks of the songs were performed by the whole band, and the various members then recorded the wide variety of vocal and instrumental overdubs, which included keyboards played by John Fogerty and Cook, and a saxophone section played entirely by John Fogerty.

Track listing

 Sides one and two were combined as tracks 1–10 on CD reissues.

Personnel
Performers
 John Fogerty – vocals, lead guitar, piano, organ, Fender Rhodes, saxophone, percussion, producer, arranger
 Tom Fogerty – rhythm guitar, percussion
 Stu Cook – bass guitar, double bass, piano, kalimba, percussion
 Doug Clifford – drums, percussion

Production
 Ed Caraeff – photography, cover design
 Russ Gary – engineer, mixing
 Kevin L. Gray – engineer, mastering
 Steve Hoffman – remastering
 Richard Edlund – cover design
 Wayne Kimbell – cover design, photography
 Baron Wolman – photography
 Joel Selvin – liner notes

Charts

Weekly charts

Year-end charts

Certifications

References

External links

Pendulum Infosite 

1970 albums
Creedence Clearwater Revival albums
Albums recorded at Wally Heider Studios
Fantasy Records albums
Albums produced by John Fogerty